Sahffee Jubpre (born 31 March 2001) is a Singaporean footballer who plays as a defender for Singapore Premier League side Young Lions and the Singapore national team.

Career statistics

Club

International Statistics

U19 International caps

References

2001 births
Living people
Singaporean footballers
Association football defenders
Singapore Premier League players
Hougang United FC players
Young Lions FC players
Singapore youth international footballers